Bob Hay born Robert Donald Hay, Jr. on January 28, 1950, is an American songwriter and the multi-instrumentalist and vocalist for Athens, Georgia projects the Squalls, Bob Hay & the Jolly Beggars, Noogeez, A. Che Why and Supercluster.

Biography

Hay was born on January 28, 1950, in Grand Rapids, Michigan to a postal worker and housewife. He attended Aquinas College (Grand Rapids) and worked as a school teacher and as a statistician prior to divorcing his first wife and  moving to Kennebunkport, Maine.

As musician

Hay was convinced by Ken Starratt to move to Athens, Georgia, from Maine after making a trip to Athens in the late 1970s and surveying the blossoming music scene. Bob met other local musicians including roommate "Big" Al Walsh, Mig Little and Diana Torell and formed the band the Squalls. They were well known for switching instruments and singing duties during their shows. In 1986, they were featured in the movie Athens, GA: Inside Out. The Squalls underwent various lineup changes after Mig Little left the band. They were joined by Mark Cooper Smith, Juan Molina, Paul Hammond and others at various times during their career. The Squalls made a self-released e.p. and single, as well as two albums for Dog Gone It Records-a label owned by Jefferson Holt, the manager for REM. The Squalls made several trips up and down the East coast of the U.S. and a trip through the mid-West before disbanding.

Hay never stopped jamming with his friends and briefly performed with a project called the Yams who learned covers of songs in hopes of playing bars and fraternity parties. This is where he began his association with multi-instrumentalist Bill David, a local musician with deep roots in the community.

Bob Hay & the Jolly Beggars began as a solo project. Hay became fascinated with the works of Robert Burns, the 18th century Scottish bard, after a random comment which was made during a jam session. He found songs by Robert Burns at the University of Georgia library and began to learn and arrange them. Other former members of the Squalls, including Ken Starratt's youngest son Gabriel Fricks-Starratt, became interested and joined. They have released 3 CDs and perform sporadically in and around Athens, Georgia.

Noogeez was dreamed up by Ken Starratt as a way to use Bob's older Squalls material in a kid-friendly format. 2 videos have been made so far using this material. Members of this band include  Ken and Jorma Starratt, Ken's son.  Their first video, "Kathy", won the audience choice award during the 2007 Athfest Sprockets competition.

A. Che Why is Hay's latest project. He records his ideas and songs using just a sequencer and a guitar. Sometimes he "records in the morning" and has his work on My Space "by the evening."

Hay married Vanessa Briscoe, the lead singer for Pylon in 1986 and they have two daughters. She recruited him to play acoustic guitar in her recording project Supercluster. They released an e.p. "Special 5" in December 2007. Supercluster plan to record additional material in July 2008 and release the whole as a full length work called Waves by the end of 2009.

Discography
Squalls
 Squalls  EP (Mbrella, 1984)
 Crickets !! single (Mbrella, 1985)
 Athens, Georgia Inside/Out LP (compilation, 2 songs, IRS, 1986)
 Rebel Shoes LP (Dog Gone It 1987)
 No Time LP (Dog Gone It 1988)

Bob Hay & the Jolly Beggars
 Toils Obscure CD (self-released 2004)
 Tam Lin CD (self-released 2006)
 Athfest 2005 CD (compilation of various Athens,GA artists, Ghostmeat, 2005)
 Bawdy Noise CD (self-released 2009)
Supercluster
 Special 5 e.p.'' CD (self-released 2007)

References

External links
Squalls entry on AllMusic
Bob Hay & the Jolly Beggars website
 Noogeez on myspace
 A.Che Why on myspace
Supercluster on myspace
Supercluster, The New Sound of Numbers and A.Che Why featured in the Athens Banner-Herald
 

1950 births
American multi-instrumentalists
Aquinas College (Michigan) alumni
Musicians from Grand Rapids, Michigan
Musicians from Athens, Georgia
Living people
American male songwriters
Songwriters from Michigan
Songwriters from Georgia (U.S. state)